Gogle may refer to:

 A misspelling of "Google"
 A misspelling of "Goggle"
 A misspelling of "Good"
 A misspelling of "Googe"
 A misspelling of "Gogol"